Fifty Candles is a 1921 American silent mystery film directed by Irvin Willat and starring Bertram Grassby, Marjorie Daw and Ruth King.

Cast
 Bertram Grassby as Hung Chin Chung
 Marjorie Daw as Mary-Will Tellfair
 Ruth King as Carlotta Drew
 Wade Boteler as Mark Drew
 William A. Carroll as Henry Drew
 George Webb as Dr. Parker
 Dorothy Sibley as Mah Li
 Edmund Burns as Ralph Coolidge

References

Bibliography
 Munden, Kenneth White. The American Film Institute Catalog of Motion Pictures Produced in the United States, Part 1. University of California Press, 1997.

External links
 

1921 films
1921 mystery films
American silent feature films
American mystery films
Films directed by Irvin Willat
Films distributed by W. W. Hodkinson Corporation
1920s English-language films
1920s American films
Silent mystery films